Cnephasia holorphna is a species of moth of the family Tortricidae. It is found in New Zealand.

The wingspan is about 18 mm. The forewings are fuscous with scattered whitish scales and scattered strigulae consisting of dark fuscous and blackish scales. The hindwings are fuscous, but darker towards the termen.

References

Moths described in 1911
Cnephasiini